István Stefanov (born 19 July 1964) is a retired Hungarian football midfielder. He is from Bulgarian descent

References

1964 births
Living people
Hungarian footballers
Csepel SC footballers
Budapest Honvéd FC players
Association football midfielders